The Tschingel Pass (2,787 m) is a high mountain pass of the Bernese Alps, connecting Kandersteg with Stechelberg in the Bernese Oberland. It is the lowest pass between the upper Kandertal and the valley of Lauterbrunnen. The pass is glaciated and separated the Kander Glacier from the Tschingel Glacier. It lies between the Blüemlisalp and the Tschingelhorn and is overlooked by the Mutthorn.

References

External links
Tschingel Pass on Hikr

Mountain passes of the canton of Bern
Mountain passes of the Alps